is a popular hero of Japanese folklore. His name is often translated as Peach Boy, but is directly translated as Peach + Tarō, a common Japanese given name. Momotarō is also the title of various books, films and other works that portray the tale of this hero.

There is a popular notion that Momotarō is a local hero of Okayama Prefecture, but this claim was invented in the modern era. This notion is not accepted as consensus in scholarly circles.

Story

The present conventional form of the tale (Standard Type) can be summarized as follows:

Momotarō was born from a giant peach, which was found floating down a river by an old, childless woman who was washing clothes there. The woman and her husband discovered the child when they tried to open the peach to eat it. The child explained that he had been bestowed by the Gods to be their son. The couple named him Momotarō, from momo (peach) and tarō (eldest son in the family). When he was just five years old, he was able to cut a big tree with just an old knife 

When he matured into adolescence, Momotarō left his parents to fight a band of Oni (demons or ogres) who marauded over their land, by seeking them out in the distant island where they dwelled (a place called Onigashima or "Demon Island"). En route, Momotarō met and befriended a talking dog, monkey and pheasant, who agreed to help him in his quest in exchange for a portion of his rations (kibi dango or "millet dumplings"). At the island, Momotarō and his animal friends penetrated the demons' fort and beat the band of demons into surrendering. Momotarō and his new friends returned home with the demons' plundered treasure and the demon chief as a captive.

This Standard Type of "Momotarō" was defined and popularized due to them being printed in school textbooks during the Meiji Period.

This is the result of development of the literary "Momotarō", which had been handwritten and printed since the early Edo period into Meiji. One significant change is that in most examples of Edo Period literature, Momotarō was not born from a peach, but born naturally to the elderly couple who ate the peach and regained their youth.

Development in literature
Although the oral version of the story may have emerged during the Muromachi period (1392–1573), it may not have been set down in writing until the Edo period (1603–1867). The oldest works of Momotaro known to have existed had been dated to the Genroku era (1688–1704) or perhaps earlier.

Edo period
These older texts from around the Genroku era (e.g. The late date of the reprint has sometimes caused it to be classed as kibyōshi ("yellow cover") or later type of kusazōshi literature, but it should properly be classed as akahon ("red book") or early type.

A second group of texts, which Koike considered to be younger, includes the miniature akahon, printed in Kyōhō 8 (1723). This miniature book is now considered to be the oldest surviving copy of any written Momotarō story.

Whether belonging to the first or second groups, texts from the Edo Period generally follow the same general plot as the modern standard versions but exhibit certain differences in detail.

Dumpling, kindling, animals
In the first group, the old man goes out to cut grass, rather than to cut . The same three companion beasts (pheasant, monkey, then dog) appear in both groups, but in different order. Though the order of the animals is not significant to the story, the most common order that appear is the dog, the monkey, and then the pheasant. In every variation, all three animal companions agree to help Momotarō in exchange for a portion of his food.

Birth from peach
As noted above, in most of the Edo Period books, peach boy is not born from the peach but from the woman who consumes the peach and grows years younger in age. Both the first and second groups consist entirely of "rejuvenation" types. The "birth from the peach" type examples (such as the version in Takizawa Bakin's 1811 essay  "Swallowstone Miscellany") are found among tales that have deviated further, which Koike assigns to a third group of texts. While "birth from the peach" version has not been confirmed in earlier written texts from the Edo Period, one tantalizing sculpture dating to 1614 depicted a man standing in the middle of a split peach. This purported Momotarō carving at Kehi Shrine in Tsuruga, Fukui was lost during the air raids of 1945.

Momotarō's age

It was noted that the protagonist Momotarō was being drawn progressively younger by artists over the years. In one subjective estimation, Momotarō appeared about age 30-ish until c. 1735, 25-ish up to c. 1800, and 20-ish until the end of Edo Period in 1867.

And in Momotarō takara no kurairi (c. 1830-40), Momotarō was aged sixteen. The Momotarō in Iwaya Sazanami's version of 1894 was of similar age (15 years old) when he resolved to go to devil island.

Researcher  also noticed the trend of Momotarō being depicted younger and younger, and he dubbed the phenomenon .

Meiji period
After Japan abandoned the feudal system and entered the Meiji era,  became a seminal figure in how the Momotaro story was shaped and became familiarized to the Japanese masses. For he was not only the author of the Momotaro tales in his commercially successful folktale collections, but also a major contributor to the textbook versions.

The "Momotarō" tale was first incorporated into nationalized textbooks for elementary schools by the Meiji government in 1887. It was subsequently omitted from the 1st edition of the National Language Reader or  but reappeared from the 2nd edition onward to the 5th edition. It has been generally accepted that the 2nd edition reader of 1910 was de facto written by storybook author Iwaya Sazanami, who had joined the Ministry of Education as nonpermanent staff in 1906.

Iwaya had already published a version of "Momotaro" (1894) for his Nihon mukashibanashi (Japanese Folktales), where Momotaro is cast as a military soldier or commander (shōgun) of Great Japan (Dainihon), dispatched on a punitive campaign to quell the ogres who live in the northeast. Older texts took the punishing of oni for granted and dispensed with explaining what crimes the oni committed to deserve condemnation. But in Iwaya's version, the ogres were explicitly stated as being evil beings, who devoured the "poor people" and taken "plunder" from the Emperor's land of Japan (Ozaki's translation), thus morally justifying Momotaro's expedition. It has been suggested these ogres represented the Qing dynasty of China since the publication occurred in the year of outbreak of the Sino-Japanese War.

Taishō and Shōwa eras
From the 3rd edition National Language Reader (1918–1932) onwards (until the end of World War II), "Momotaro" has occupied the spot of the last tale in Book 1 of these nationalized elementary textbook series. Teachers in essays submitted in 1917 stated that the perception of the Momotaro tale was shifting, so that they were seen as containing lessons of assertiveness and helping in the material advancement of one's country. There was criticism from the liberalism side, for example, the novelist Yamamoto Yūzō (1925) protesting that the oni were being punished for no apparent reason, and is "tantamount to telling [children] to think of foreigners as oni".

In the early Shōwa era, after Emperor Hirohito assumed the throne, Momotarō continued to be used to instill patriotism (or the teachings of the Rescript on Education) pupils with the 4th edition National Language Reader (1933–1938) which begins with the picture of the cherry blossom. The "Momotarō" of the 4th edition was modified so that the oni now stated "We will no longer torment the people nor take things. Please spare our lives", and forfeits their treasures out of their own volition, thus addressing the foregoing issues (i.e., Momotarō accused of attacking oni for no legitimate reason).

The use of Momotarō in wartime propaganda against the U.S. and its Allies was discussed extensively by John W. Dower in his book War Without Mercy (1986). Dower is credited with coining the term "Momotarō paradigm" in this respect. Momotarō disappeared from Japanese textbooks at the end of World War II.

Oral variants
The story has some regional variations in oral telling.

In some variants, a red and white box are seen floating down the river, and when the red box is chosen to be recovered, Momotarō is found inside. These may be a red box and a black box, or the box may contain a peach inside. These types are often seen in the northern parts of Japan (Tōhoku and Hokuriku regions).

Or Momotarō may exhibit the characteristic of the lazy protagonist in the  "Sleeping Boy" stories. These subtypes have been collected mainly in the Shikoku and Chūgoku regions.

There are variances about the Momotarō's process of growth; one is that he grew up to meet the expectation of the old couple to be a fine boy. Another is that he grew up to be a strong but lazy person who just sleeps all day and does not do anything. It is possible that the Momotarō being a fine boy version is more famous to give lessons to children. Nowadays, Momotarō is one of the most famous characters in Japan, as an ideal model for young kids for his kind-heartedness, bravery, power, and care for his parents.

Grown up, Momotarō goes on his journey to defeat the demons when he hears about the demons of the Onigashima (demon island). In some versions of the story, Momotarō volunteered to go help the people by repelling the demons, but in some stories he was forced by the townspeople or others to go on a journey. However, all the stories describe Momotarō defeating the Oni and live happily ever after with the old couple.

Claims as local hero
Momotarō now enjoys popular association with Okayama City or its prefecture, but this association was only created in the modern era. The publication of a book by Nanba Kinnosuke entitled Momotarō no Shijitsu (1930) for example helped the notion of Momotarō's origins in Okayama to gain wider familiarity. Still, even as late as the antebellum period before World War II (1941–1945), Okayama was considered only the third contender behind two other regions known as Momotarō's homeland.

The demon island of the story is sometimes associated with Megijima Island, an island in the Seto Inland Sea near Takamatsu, due to the vast manmade caves found there.

Inuyama, Aichi has  with a legend associated with it. In the 1920s and 1930s, lyricist Ujō Noguchi wrote three "folk songs" for the locality alluding to the Momotaro legend.

English translations

The story has been translated into English many times. "The Adventures of Little Peachling" appeared in A.B. Mitford's Tales of Old Japan in 1871. William Elliot Griffis published a version in 1880, which remained obscure even to researchers, even though English translations in subsequent decades apparently borrowed from Griffis's phraseology and use of idiom, sometimes even copying outright.

Rev. David Thompson's translation as "Little Peachling" appeared as the first volume of Hasegawa Takejirō's Japanese Fairy Tale series in 1885. A second edition appeared in 1886, with a different set of illustrations, drawn by Kobayashi Eitaku

Susan Ballard included the tale in Fairy Tales from Far Japan (1899).

Yei Theodora Ozaki included a loosely translated version in her Japanese Fairy Tales (1903); Ozaki's retellings were based on a version by "Sadanami sanjin" (sic., i.e.).

There was another English translation that used the same source as Ozaki and published around the same time, namely, "The Story of Peach-Boy" in Iwaya's Fairy Tales of Old Japan (1903, repub. 1914) translated by Hannah Riddell. The translation of the collection was a collaborative effort with other translators, such as Fanny B. Greene, Tsuda Umeko and others. This latter effort was acknowledged by Iwaya himself.

Teresa Peirce Williston in her Japanese Fairy Tales, Second Series, in 1911.

The tale was translated as Peach-Prince and the Demons and included in the compilation Fairy stories my children love best of all, although the compiler did not indicate its Japanese origin.

Momotarō's Song

The popular children's song about Momotarō titled Momotarō-san no Uta (Momotarō's Song) was first published in 1911; the text's author is unattributed, while the melody was written by Teiichi Okano.  The first two stanzas, with romanization and translation, are given below.

{|
|-
!"Momotarō-san no uta" !! 桃太郎さんの歌 !! "Momotarō's Song"
|-
|Momotarō-san, Momotarō-san
|桃太郎さん、桃太郎さん
|Momotarō, Momotarō
|-
|Okoshi ni tsuketa kibidango
|お腰につけたきびだんご
|Those millet dumplings on your waist
|-
|Hitotsu watashi ni kudasai na?
|一つ私に下さいな！
|Won't you give me one?
|-
|Yarimashō, yarimashō
|やりましょう、やりましょう
|I'll give you one, I'll give you one
|-
|Kore kara oni no seibatsu ni
|これから鬼の征伐に
|If you'll come with me on a quest to conquer the oni
|-
|Tsuite ikunara yarimashō!
|ついて行くならやりましょう
|I'll give you one
|}

As war propaganda icon 

Portrayal of Momotarō as a soldier in the Japanese Imperial Army fighting hostile nations was already happening by the (First) Sino-Japanese War (1894–1895). The Momotaro tale was altered by Iwaya Sazanami in 1894 so that the oni lived to the northeast of Japan, a thinly veiled reference to Qing China given the then current geopolitics. Iwaya was not purely a major figure in children's literature, but a government official working as the head of the editorial bureau of the Ministry of Education, since 1878. Iwaya would later pen a whole book of essay on the use of Momotaro as an instructional tool, Momotarō-shugi no kyōiku ("the Education Theory Based on Principles in Momotaro", 1915).

Comic images picturing Momotarō defending Japan against Oni representing Russian "Northern Devils" were given out during the 1904–1905 Russo-Japanese War.

Momotarō was an immensely popular figure in Japan during World War II, appearing in many wartime films and cartoons. Momotarō represented the Japanese government, and the enemy states, namely the Allies, later including the United States was symbolized by the oni, the demonic figure. One wartime film, in which Momotarō and his animals mount on a military operation for the Japanese Armed Forces (against the British) is Momotarō's Divine Sea Warriors.

See also
 Kibi dango (millet dumpling)
 Kintarō
 Urashima Tarō
 Uriko-hime

Explanatory notes

References
Notes

Bibliography

 

 
 
  online via HathiTrust. Part 1 of 12. Unpaginated. 42 pp.
 
  
 
 
 
 
 
 

 
 
 
  (reprint Mineruva Shobō, 2004)

External links 

 
 文化財指定 [Cultural Property Designation] at Kehi Shrine homepage - The purported "Momotaro" carving (photo postcard)

Japanese folklore
Japanese literature
Japanese fairy tales
Male characters in literature
Child characters in literature
Fictional ogres
Fictional adoptees
Oni
Cultural history of Japan